Alfred George Healing (23 August 1868 – 18 February 1945) was an Australian rules footballer who played for the Melbourne Football Club in the Victorian Football League (VFL) and Victorian Football Association (VFA). Healing was the founder of A. G. Healing Ltd. one of the largest manufacturing companies in Australia at the time of his death in 1945.

Notes

External links 

Alf Healing on Demonwiki

1868 births
1945 deaths
Australian rules footballers from Melbourne
Melbourne Football Club players
Melbourne Football Club (VFA) players
People from Richmond, Victoria
20th-century Australian businesspeople
Businesspeople from Melbourne